Shivaranjani or Sivaranjani is a musical scale used in Indian classical music. There are two scales, one in Hindustani music and one in Carnatic music. The Hindustani rāga is a pentatonic scale, as is the Carnatic scale categorized as Audava-Audava (audava meaning 'of 5') resulting in 5 notes in the Arohanam and 5 in the Avarohanam.

Hindustani scale 
The Hindustani rāga Shivaranjani belongs to the Kaafi thaat in terms of classification of the scale. Its structure is as follows:
  : 
  : 
The komal(soft) gandhar(g) in place of shuddh gandhar (G) is the difference between this rāga and the global musical scale of Bhoop.

Borrowed into Carnatic music 

In Karnatic Music, this is a janya rāga (derived scale) from 22nd mela-kartha raga Kharaharapriya. It is a audava-audava rāgam in Carnatic music classification (i.e., a ragam that has five notes in both its arohana and avarohana). Its  structure (ascending and descending scale) using swaras in Carnatic music notation is as follows:
  : 
  : 
(the variant notes used in this scale are chathusruthi rishabham, sadharana gandharam, chathusruthi dhaivatham other than the invariants shadjam and panchamam)

Popular compositions 
 The opening stanza of Kurai ondrum illai based on lyrics of Rajaji
Andavan Ambe composed by Papanasam Sivan
Antaryami Alasithi Solasithi - popular rendering of Annamacharya's krithi.
Yamanelli Kanenendu, Aluvudyatako Rangayya - popular renderings of Purandara Dasa's krithis.
Va Velava composed by M D Ramanathan

Film songs

Tamil

Related rāgams 
This section covers the theoretical and scientific aspects of this rāgam.

Graha bhedam 
Shivaranjani's notes when shifted using Graha bhedam, yields 2 other pentatonic rāgams, namely, Sunadavinodini and Revati. Graha bhedam is the step taken in keeping the relative note frequencies same, while shifting the shadjam to the next note in the rāgam. See Graha bhedam on Shivaranjani for more details and an illustration.

Scale similarities 
 Mohanam is a popular rāgam which has the antara gandharam in place of sadharana gandharam. Its  structure is S R2 G3 P D2 S : S D2 P G3 R2 S
 Abhogi is a popular rāgam which has the shuddha madhyamam in place of panchamam. Its  structure is S R2 G2 M1 D2 S : S D2 M1 G2 R2 S

Carnatic scale 
The Carnatic scale Shivaranjani is a janya rāgam (derived scale) associated with the 64th parent scale Vachaspati (melakarta). It has vakra prayoga (zig-zag notes in its scale and note phrases) and its scale is as follows.
  : 
  :

Compositions 
The compositions in this scale are:
 Andavan anbe and Tarunamidaya dayai composed by Papanasam Sivan
 Maha Tripura Sundari Varnam composed by Madurai R. Muralidaran

See also 
 Bhopali
 Durga

Notes

References

External links 
 Film Songs in Rag Shivaranjani (Hindustani)

Hindustani ragas
Janya ragas (kharaharapriya)
Janya ragas